Nenad Cvetković may refer to:

 Nenad Cvetković (born 1948), retired Serbian association football player
 Nenad R. Cvetković (born 1996), Serbian association football player who plays for FK Sloboda Užice
 Nenad N. Cvetković (born 1996), Serbian association football player who plays for FC Ashdod